All is the tenth studio album by French musician Yann Tiersen. It was released on 15 February 2019 through Mute Records.

Track listing

Charts

References

2019 albums
Yann Tiersen albums
Mute Records albums